Bryantown is an unincorporated community and census-designated place in Charles County, Maryland, United States, adjacent to Maryland Route 5. As of the 2010 census, it had a population of 655.

Bryantown stands on land known as Boarman's Manor, a  manor granted to Major William Boarman in 1674.  Bryantown is associated with the flight in 1865 of President Abraham Lincoln's assassin John Wilkes Booth, and its St. Mary's Catholic Church is the burial place of Dr. Samuel Mudd, who lived  to the north, and who in November 1864 had first met Booth at the church.

Oakland was listed on the National Register of Historic Places in 1983.  The Bryantown Historic District was listed in 1985, and The Lindens in 1990.

Demographics

References

Census-designated places in Maryland
Census-designated places in Charles County, Maryland